Khorezmian was a literary Turkic language of the medieval Golden Horde of Central Asia and Eastern Europe. It was a preliminary stage of the Chagatai language, which would remain an important language of Central Asia until the 20th century. It was based on Old Turkic further to the east, though incorporating local Oghuz and Kipchak words.

Translations 
 
Qiṣaṣ al-Anbiyā’

References

 Johanson & Johanson, 2003, The Turkic Languages

Karluk languages
Medieval languages
Turkic languages
Extinct languages of Asia